Aliens: Original Motion Picture Soundtrack is the soundtrack album for the 1986 James Cameron film Aliens.

The score was composed by James Horner. It was performed by the London Symphony Orchestra and recorded at Abbey Road Studios in London between 15-26 April 1986.

The film was the first of Cameron and Horner's three collaborations, though they were already acquaintances from their time at Roger Corman's New World Studios in the early 80s, where both men had started their careers.

The production of Aliens fell behind schedule in post-production, leaving Horner less than two weeks to write the score to the finished film, rather than the six weeks he had initially been promised.  Despite the lack of time, Cameron and producer Gale Ann Hurd requested frequent changes to the music and made last-minute changes to the film's edit, which forced Horner to re-write the music. The combination of a lack of time and constant changes resulted in a falling out between Horner and Cameron, who didn't work together again until Titanic more than a decade later.

The score features some of Horner's most complex and modernistic writing, making widespread use of dissonance, aleatoric and extended orchestral techniques and sound design. Horner also used tape delays to create "echoes" on some separately-recorded orchestral parts, a technique Jerry Goldsmith had used in the original Alien score. It also includes musical references to Gayane's Adagio from Aram Khachaturian's Gayane ballet suite, which had been used in Stanley Kubrick's 2001: A Space Odyssey (1968).

Despite the difficulties during the score's production, it was nominated for an Academy Award in 1986. The soundtrack album was released the following year, in 1987.

Track listing

Original track listing
 "Main Title" (5:10)
 "Going After Newt" (3:08)
 "Sub-Level 3" (6:11)
 "Ripley's Rescue" (3:13)
 "Atmosphere Station" (3:05)
 "Futile Escape" (8:13)
 "Dark Discovery" (2:00)
 "Bishop's Countdown" (2:47)
 "Resolution and Hyperspace" (6:10)

Deluxe edition track listing
 "Main Title" (5:13)
 "Bad Dreams" (1:22)
 "Dark Discovery/Newt's Horror" (2:07)
 "LV-426" (2:03)
 "Combat Drop" (3:29)
 "The Complex" (1:34)
 "Atmosphere Station" (3:11)
 "Med.Lab." (2:04)
 "Newt" (1:14)
 "Sub-Level 3" (6:36)
 "Ripley's Rescue" (3:19)
 "FaceHuggers" (4:24)
 "Futile Escape" (8:29)
 "Newt is Taken" (2:04)
 "Going After Newt" (3:18)
 "The Queen" (1:45)
 "Bishop's Countdown" (2:50)
 "Queen To Bishop" (2:31)
 "Resolution and Hyperspace" (6:27)
Bonus Tracks
 "Bad Dreams" (alternate) (1:23)
 "Ripley's Rescue" (percussion only) (3:20)
 "LV-426" (alternate edit – film version) (1:13)
 "Combat Drop" (percussion only) (3:24)
 "Hyperspace" (alternate ending) (2:08)

Credits
Edited By [Music] – Michael Clifford (2), Robin Clark (3) 
Executive-Producer – Richard Kraft, Tom Null 
Mixed By [Music Scoring Mixer] – Eric Tomlinson
Orchestra – The London Symphony Orchestra 
Orchestrated By – Greig McRitchie 
Producer, Conductor, Composed By – James Horner 
℗ © 1986 Twentieth Century Fox Film Corp.

Uses in other films and trailers
The music for Aliens has been widely used in other media - there were reportedly 24 different film trailers that used "Bishop's Countdown" alone. Some of those trailers include Misery (1990), Alien 3 (1992), Broken Arrow (1996), Dante's Peak (1997), Lake Placid (1999) and Minority Report (2002).

The first 90 seconds of "Resolution and Hyperspace" (which was replaced by a repeat of "Bishop's Countdown" in the finished film) was later tracked onto the ending of Die Hard (1988).

References

External links

Alien (franchise) soundtracks
James Horner albums
1987 soundtrack albums
Varèse Sarabande soundtracks